Lee Oser (born in 1958 in New York City) is a Christian humanist, novelist, and literary critic. He is a former president of the Association of Literary Scholars, Critics, and Writers. Oser is Roman Catholic. He was educated at Reed College and Yale University, where he received his PhD in English in 1995. He teaches Religion and Literature at the College of the Holy Cross, in Worcester, Massachusetts.

Novels

Out of What Chaos 

Set on the West Coast during Bush II's first term, Out of What Chaos (Scarith], 2007) showcases the escapades of Rex and The Brains as they break into the Portland rock scene, record their first CD, and tour from Vancouver to LA behind their chart-topping single, “F U. I Just Want To Get My Rocks Off.”  In the end, the boys must make a decision about how to live. Literary critic and theorist, Dr. Jean-Michel Rabaté calls Oser a "worthy debater" and praises Out of What Chaos, saying he "enjoyed it fully."

The Oracles Fell Silent 
Oser's second novel follows its predecessor by exploring the intersection of pop culture and religion. The young narrator, Richard Bellman, recounts his experience as personal secretary to a sixties' rock legend, Sir Ted Pop.

Reviews of The Oracles
Early reviews have praised the novel, while focusing on Oser's attempt to address contemporary culture from a Catholic point of view.

“Throughout, Oser proves himself to be a master of language. Many times while reading Oracles one is struck by a particularly supple turn of phrase or a seemingly innocuous observation, disarmingly charming but laden with profound wisdom. He reminds us that ‘your story will be written by someone you could never buy, and you wouldn’t like the narrative.’ It is the great virtue of this novel that it manages to bring us to that simultaneously glorious and terrible realization.”  
–First Things

“All successful new works of art defy easy classification. They force us to stop and reflect not only on the work itself, but also upon our understanding of the labels and assumptions that we attempt to apply as we navigate their unfolding contours. Lee Oser’s second novel, The Oracles Fell Silent, appears to be an allegory, but it is unlike any other allegory that most of us will ever read...we need to stop and reflect…on how the Commedia might have looked to Dante’s contemporaries, with its jettison of Latin in favor of the vernacular. Would it not have looked something like this?”  
–The Chesterton Review

What's bracing about Oser's work is its absolute lack of puritanism. Like Walker Percy, he suspects that Catholics might already be acquainted with sin. He fearlessly depicts sex, he reports the bad language, and he doesn't shy away from uncomfortable humor....It's by no means a realist novel, however, but something like a tongue-in-cheek allegory, as one begins to suspect when Sir Ted meets his match in Hurricane Gabriel and the mystery of Johnny Donovan's death finally comes to light. Oser's novel makes its readers ask which oracles they've been attending and what might happen in their silence. Young Richard Bellman—it's worth thinking about what a “bellman” is—emerges largely unscathed, and with an essential quiet dignity. There's no triumphalism here, no relegation of souls to heaven or hell. Oser's gift is making it deeply attractive to come back to the sanity of worshiping what deserves it. 
–Glenn Arbery, Dappled Things

“what comes through…is the way that his characters use religious language; it is not forced, and sounds, to my ear at least, as how people who need language to express serious things, but who don't actually believe, are nonetheless forced back on the language of faith. When Bellman finally understands how Donovan might have met his end, the insight comes wrapped in a reflection on choice, fate, and the unknown ways of God—a meditation that is both subtle and profound. If Oser is…writing in a still small voice, maybe that's because it's in just such a voice that people typically speak of first and last things.” 
–Gerald J. Russello, Books & Culture

“The Oracles Fell Silent is a seething indictment of contemporary preoccupations with fame, one written with humor and style…Certain to enrapture readers interested in rock and roll’s less seductive underbelly, Oser’s book offers a captivating and witty picture of the features and failings of contemporary culture.” 
–Foreword Reviews

Oregon Confetti 

Pushing forty, Portland art dealer Devin Adams has been so successful conning the local Philistines that he can no longer tell actual art from the highly profitable junk that supports his living. But the sudden appearance on his doorstep of the great painter John Sun, bearing a strange child, changes all that, confronting Devin with the hard facts of his life, from his lusts and obsessions to his own small part in a mass psychosis that denies the existence of love.

Reviews of Oregon Confetti

In early reviews of Oregon Confetti, Oser's Catholic vantage point continues to be a source of interest and contention. Critic Anthony Domestico lists the novel among Commonweal Magazine'''s Top Books of 2017, saying "Antic, absurdist, comic, and Catholic, this ribald novel grows out of the Evelyn Waugh and John Kennedy Toole tradition. But I also heard echoes of W. H. Auden. Like him, Oser finds theology in two unlikely genres: the picaresque and the detective novel."

According to Trevor C. Merrill at The University Bookman, Oregon Confetti "represents an edgier, rowdier brand of religious literature. It takes on today’s shoddiest secular ideologies and shows the dreariness of succumbing to them, but also the appeal of making the sacrifices necessary to leave them behind. Instead of addressing a nonbelieving audience 'which puts little stock in either grace or the devil,' as Flannery O’Connor put it, Oser aims at a faithful subculture likely to share, or at the very least to sympathize with, his basic views on art, sex, and religion....In short: Oregon Confetti makes it possible once more to ask not where the American Catholic novel has gone, but where it is headed next."

Martin Lockerd at Literary Matters comments on the novel's satire, saying "At times, [Oser's] relentless satire recalls Walker Percy and Evelyn Waugh at their best...Other assaults on modern liberalism are harder to follow....It is a Catholic novel with a capital C. In a contemporary literary scene where such books almost never find a publisher, Oregon Confetti provides a welcome religious counter to the deluge of post-secular malaise found in most novels. Nevertheless," Lockerd comments, "I couldn’t help wanting something a bit subtler."

Anne-Sophie Olsen at The Cornell Book Review portrays Oregon Confetti as such: "In this sharp and fast-paced novel, author Lee Oser pits love against lust, beauty against aesthetics, and truth against falsehood in the politically charged art scene of Portland, Oregon. With writing that is self-aware and guided by a trust in the mysterious, Oser follows art dealer Devin Adams through tangled webs that intersect the past with the present and the cynical with the transcendent...Though Oser occasionally indulges in more teaching than storytelling, he has succeeded in holding honest, rough-edged characters up to the light of mystery and letting moments of grace change them for the better."

Finally, In October 2018, critic Joseph Pearce listed Oregon Confetti in his list of "The Best of Contemporary Christian Fiction."

Interviews for Oregon Confetti

Oser has been interviewed in the following:Crisis Magazine,Dappled Things,Law and Liberty.

 Christian humanism 
Oser's defense of Christian humanism is set out in his book The Return of Christian Humanism. In a lengthy review-essay, Sir Anthony Kenny argued that Oser's position had been superannuated by modernity. Alan Blackstock places Oser in the tradition of G. K. Chesterton and compares Oser's ethical criticism to that of Alasdair MacIntyre. Oser subsequently developed his position in a 2021 essay, "Christian Humanism and the Radical Middle."

 Bibliography T. S. Eliot and American Poetry  University of Missouri Press, 1998 The Ethics of Modernism: Moral Ideas in Yeats, Eliot, Joyce, Woolf and Beckett  Cambridge University Press, 2007 Out of What Chaos: A Novel Scarith, 2007  The Return of Christian Humanism: Chesterton, Tolkien, Eliot and the Romance of History  University of Missouri Press, 2007 The Oracles Fell Silent Wiseblood Books, 2014 Oregon Confetti Wiseblood Books, 2017 Christian Humanism in Shakespeare: A Study in Religion and Literature Catholic University of America Press, 2022 Old Enemies: A Satire Senex Press, 2022 
Ed., Shakespeare's Reformation: Christian Humanism and the Death of God'', by Nalin Ranasinghe St. Augustine's Press, 2022

References

1958 births
21st-century American novelists
American literary critics
Living people
College of the Holy Cross faculty
Reed College alumni
American male novelists
21st-century American male writers
Novelists from Massachusetts
21st-century American non-fiction writers
American male non-fiction writers